Lucie Martínková (born 19 September 1986) is a Czech football striker, currently playing for Sparta Prague in the Czech Women's First League and the Champions League.

Club career
Martínková scored both goals in Sparta's 2–1 round of 32, second leg win against Apollon Limassol in the 2011–12 UEFA Women's Champions League.

International career
She is a member of the Czech national team. She made her debut on 8 June 2003 in a match against Ukraine. On 7 November 2019, Martínková played her 100th match for Czech Republic in a 4–0 away win over Azerbaijan in the UEFA Women's Euro 2022 qualifying.

International goals

Personal life
Her twin sister, Irena Martínková is also a women's footballer, who plays alongside her for club and country. In 2013 and 2014, the Martínková sisters played for KIF Örebro DFF of the Swedish Damallsvenskan.

Recognition
Lucie was voted talent of the year at the 2004 Czech Footballer of the Year (women) and Czech Footballer of the Year (women) at the 2012, 2013 and 2014. In the 2014–15, 2020–21  and 2021–22 season she was the top scorer of the Czech Women's First League.

References

External links
 Lucie Martínková at zeny.fotbal.cz.
 
 
 

1986 births
Living people
Czech women's footballers
Czech Republic women's international footballers
Sportspeople from Kolín
Czech twins
Twin sportspeople
KIF Örebro DFF players
Expatriate women's footballers in Sweden
Damallsvenskan players
Czech expatriate women's footballers
Czech expatriate sportspeople in Sweden
Women's association football forwards
AC Sparta Praha (women) players
Czech Women's First League players
FIFA Century Club